Annibale Brasola (16 June 1925 – 30 November 2001) was an Italian racing cyclist. He won stage 17 of the 1950 Giro d'Italia.

References

External links
 

1925 births
2001 deaths
Italian male cyclists
Italian Giro d'Italia stage winners
Cyclists from the Province of Padua